The 62nd Pennsylvania House of Representatives District is located in west central Pennsylvania and has been represented by James Struzzi since 2019.

District Profile 
The 62nd District is located in Indiana County and includes the following areas:

 Armagh
 Armstrong Township
Black Lick Township
 Blairsville
 Brush Valley Township
 Buffington Township
 Burrell Township
 Center Township
 Cherryhill Township
 Clymer
Conemaugh Township
 Creekside
 East Wheatfield Township
 Homer City
 Indiana
Saltsburg
 Shelocta
 White Township
Young Township

Representatives

Recent election results 

 

}

References

External links 

 District map from the United States Census Bureau
 Pennsylvania House Legislative District Maps from the Pennsylvania Redistricting Commission.
 Population Data for District 62 from the Pennsylvania Redistricting Commission.

Government of Indiana County, Pennsylvania
62